Bonfim may refer to:

People:
Éder José de Oliveira Bonfim (born 1981), Brazilian football player
Bruno Bonfim (born 1979), middle-distance freestyle swimmer from Brazil
Dante Bonfim Costa (born 1983), usually known simply as Dante, is a Brazilian football player
Erick Flores Bonfim or simply Erick Flores (born 1989), Brazilian Attacking Midfielder
Giovânio Bonfim, or simply Wando, (born 1963), former Brazilian football player
José Travassos Valdez (1787–1862), Portuguese soldier and statesman
Leandro do Bonfim (born 1984), Brazilian attacking midfielder

Locations:
Bonfim, Roraima, municipality located in the mideast of the state of Roraima in Brazil
Bonfim (Porto), Portuguese parish, located in the municipality of Porto
Bonfim Paulista (São Paulo Good End), a district of the city of Ribeirão Preto, Brazil
Roman Catholic Diocese of Bonfim, diocese in the city of Salvador, Bahia
Bonfim, Minas Gerais, municipality in Brazil

Buildings:
Church of Nosso Senhor do Bonfim (Salvador), the most famous Catholic churches in Salvador, in Bahia, Brazil
Estádio do Bonfim, multi-use stadium in Setúbal, Portugal